Merycochoerus (Greek: "ruminant" (merux)-like "swine" (khoiros)) is an extinct genus of oreodont of the family Merycoidodontidae, endemic to North America. Fossils are widespread through the western United States.

 
 

Merycochoerus was a cud-chewing plant-eater with a long face, tusk-like canine teeth, heavy body, long tail, short feet, and four-toed hooves.

Species
M. carrikeri (syn. Promerycochoerus thomsoni)
M. chelydra (syn. Promerycochoerus barbouri)
M. magnus
M. matthewi
M. pinensis
M. proprius
M. superbus (syn. M. fricki, M. leidyi, M. macrostegus, M. montanus, M. temporalis, Promerycochoerus grandis, P. hatcheri, P. hollandi, P. inflatus, P. latidens, P. loomisi, P. lulli, P. marshi, P. microcephalus)
M. vantasselensis

Resources

 
Oligocene even-toed ungulates
Burdigalian genus extinctions
Oligocene mammals of North America
Miocene even-toed ungulates
Oligocene genus first appearances
Miocene mammals of North America
Prehistoric even-toed ungulate genera